= List of Texas Tech Lady Raiders basketball seasons =

This is a list of seasons for the Texas Tech Lady Raiders, a women's basketball team which represents Texas Tech University.

== Year by year results ==
Conference tournament winners noted with #

Season	Team	Overall	Conference	Standing	Postseason	Coaches' poll	AP poll
Susie Lynch (AIAW) (1975–1977)
1975-76	Susie Lynch	14–16	–		AIAW State Tournament		
1976-77	Susie Lynch	20–18	–		AIAW State Tournament		
Susie Lynch:		34–34	–				
Gay Benson (AIAW) (1977–1980)
1977-78	Gay Benson	35–11	–		AIAW Regional		
1978-79	Gay Benson	8–25	–		AIAW Regional		
1979-80	Gay Benson	24–11	–		AIAW Regional		
Gay Benson:		67–47	–				
Donna Wick (AIAW) (1980–1982)
1980-81	Donna Wick	13–17	–		AIAW State Tournament		
1981-82	Donna Wick	18–12	–		AIAW Regional		
Donna Wick:		31–29	–				
Marsha Sharp (Southwest, Big 12) (1982–2006)
1982-83	Marsha Sharp	22–9	6–2	T-2nd (Southwest)	NWIT Fifth Place		
1983-84	Marsha Sharp	23–7	13–3	2nd	NCAA First Round		
1984-85	Marsha Sharp	24–8	12–4	2nd	NWIT Third Place		19
1985-86	Marsha Sharp	21–9	13–3	2nd	NCAA Second Round (Bye)	21	
1986-87	Marsha Sharp	18–11	10–6	T-3rd			
1987-88	Marsha Sharp	17–13	9–7	3rd			
1988-89	Marsha Sharp	16–13	9–7	3rd			
1989-90	Marsha Sharp	20–11	11–5	3rd	NCAA First Round		
1990-91	Marsha Sharp	23–8	12–4	3rd	NCAA First Round		
1991-92	Marsha Sharp	27–5	13–1	1st#	NCAA Sixteen	15	12
1992-93	Marsha Sharp	31–3	13–1	T-1st#	NCAA Champions	1	5
1993-94	Marsha Sharp	28–5	12–2	1st	NCAA Sixteen	11	9
1994-95	Marsha Sharp	33–4	13–1	1st#	NCAA Quarterfinals	7	5
1995-96	Marsha Sharp	27–5	13–1	1st	NCAA Sixteen	12	9
1996-97	Marsha Sharp	20–9	11–5	4th (Big 12)	NCAA Second Round	19	17
1997-98	Marsha Sharp	26–5	15–1	1st#	NCAA Second Round	10	6
1998-99	Marsha Sharp	30–4	14–2	1st#	NCAA Sixteen	6	6
1999-2000	Marsha Sharp	28–5	13–3	T-1st	NCAA Quarterfinals	7	11
2000-01	Marsha Sharp	25–7	13–3	2nd	NCAA Sixteen	11	13
2001-02	Marsha Sharp	20–12	8–8	7th	NCAA Sixteen	12	17
2002-03	Marsha Sharp	29–6	13–3	3rd	NCAA Quarterfinals	6	7
2003-04	Marsha Sharp	25–8	10–6	T-4th	NCAA Second Round	17	14
2004-05	Marsha Sharp	24–8	12–4	T-3rd	NCAA Sixteen	12	14
2005-06	Marsha Sharp	15–14	9–7	5th			
Marsha Sharp:		572–189	277–89				
Kristy Curry (Big 12) (2006–2013)
2006-07	Kristy Curry	15–16	6–10	T-7th			
2007-08	Kristy Curry	17–16	4–12	T-10th	WNIT Sixteen		
2008-09	Kristy Curry	16–15	6–10	T-7th			
2009-10	Kristy Curry	18–15	5–11	T-8th	WNIT Second Round		
2010-11	Kristy Curry	22–11	8–8	6th	NCAA First Round		
2011-12	Kristy Curry	21–14	6–12	9th	WNIT Sixteen		
2012-13	Kristy Curry	21–11	11–7	T-3rd	NCAA First Round		
Kristy Curry:		130–98	46–70				
Candace Whitaker (Big 12) (2013–present)
2013-14	Candace Whitaker	7-24	0-18	10th			
2014-15	Candace Whitaker	15-16	5-13	10th			
2015-16	Candace Whitaker	13-18	3-15	9th			
2016-17	Candace Whitaker	14-17	5-13	8th			
Candace Whitaker:		49–75	13–59				
Total:		883-472					
National champion Postseason invitational champion Conference regular season champion Conference regular season and conference tournament champion Division regular season champion Division regular season and conference tournament champion Conference tournament champion

Note:

- The on-court record in 1978–79 was 14–19, but due to forfeits, the official record is 8–25
- The on-court record in 1980–81 was 12–18, but due to a forfeit, the official record is 13–17
